Stonerabbit Peak is a  mountain summit located in British Columbia, Canada.

Description
Precipitation runoff from the peak drains west to Stave Lake, and east to Harrison Lake via Skwellepiol Creek, and ultimately to the Fraser River.

Etymology
The mountain is named after the summit cairn placed by the first ascent party. The mountain's toponym was officially adopted February 4, 1980, by the Geographical Names Board of Canada as recommended by Glenn Woodsworth, Geological Survey of Canada on behalf of Alpine Club of Canada, and as identified in BC Mountaineer Magazine, October 1976.

Climate

Based on the Köppen climate classification, Stonerabbit Peak has a subarctic climate. Most weather fronts originate in the Pacific Ocean, and travel east toward the Coast Mountains where they are forced upward by the range (Orographic lift), causing them to drop their moisture in the form of rain or snowfall. As a result, the Coast Mountains experience high precipitation, especially during the winter months in the form of snowfall. Winter temperatures can drop below −20 °C with wind chill factors below −30 °C.

See also

 Geography of British Columbia

References

External links
 Weather: Stonerabbit Peak

One-thousanders of British Columbia
Pacific Ranges
New Westminster Land District
Coast Mountains